Chirakkal is a small village in Thrissur district of Kerala, South India. It is fifteen kilometers from Thrissur city, on the Cherpu-Thriprayar road.

Chirakkal is in the bank of Karuvannur River. The major area of Chirakkal is covered with paddy and coconut fields. Chirakkal has got three Major Hindu temples, Shiva (Vendrasseri Shiva Kshethram CBE), Devi (Thiruvanikkavu Amma) and Krishna (Kurumpilavu Shree Krishna Kshethram CBE) and several other family-owned temples, one Christian church named 'st antony church chirakkal'  and one mosque. Chirakkal has one LP government school and one management UP and high school in the name of Bhodhananda Swami, the first disciple of Sree Narayana Guru.

References 

Villages in Thrissur district